Glen C. Sheffer (1881–1948) was an illustrator whose most notable work was a poster for the 1933 Chicago World's Fair. He created illustrations for publications by the Kappa Sigma Fraternity, and Frank L. Baum's The Fate of a Crown. Some works have realized over $1000 in recent auction.

References

1881 births
1948 deaths
American illustrators